The Virginia House of Delegates election of 2001 was held on Tuesday, November 6.

Results

Overview

See also 
 2001 United States elections
 2001 Virginia elections
 2001 Virginia gubernatorial election
 2001 Virginia lieutenant gubernatorial election
 2001 Virginia Attorney General election

References 

House of Delegates
Virginia
Virginia House of Delegates elections